Garraun may refer to:
Garraun (Tipperary), a townland in North Tipperary
Garraun (Galway), a 598-metre mountain in Connemara, Ireland
Garraun Point, on Great Blasket Island, County Kerry, Ireland

See also
Garraunbaun, a 406-metre mountain in County Laois, Ireland
Garran, a suburb in Canberra in the Australian Capital Territory
Garron, a type of a small sturdy horse or pony.